Agate is in Sioux County, Nebraska, United States. It is home to Agate Fossil Beds National Monument.

History
A post office was established at Agate in 1899, and remained in operation until it was discontinued in 1968. Agate was named for James H. Cook's Agate Springs Ranch, which was in turn named for the agate deposits in the area.

Climate
According to the Köppen Climate Classification system, Agate has a cool semi-arid climate, abbreviated BSk on climate maps.

References

Unincorporated communities in Sioux County, Nebraska
Unincorporated communities in Nebraska